Chedraui is a publicly traded Mexican grocery store and department store chain which also operates stores in the U.S. in the states of California, Arizona, New Mexico, Texas, and Nevada under the banner name El Super and stores in Texas under the banner name Fiesta Mart.  It is traded on the Mexican Stock Exchange under the symbol CHEDRAUI.

History
Chedraui was founded in 1927 in Xalapa, Veracruz by Lebanese immigrant Lázaro Chedraui Chaya and his wife Ana Caram. They founded towards 1920 a haberdashery in the city of Xalapa, Veracruz. Originally the business was called the Port of Beirut, clearly showing its origin, but for 1927 would adopt the name House Chedraui: the Only One to Trust. In 1971 it opened the first supermarket in Xalapa, Veracruz. In 2005 it bought 29 supermarkets from Carrefour in Central and Southern Mexico. Chedraui's primary competition includes large grocers and hypermarkets such as Soriana, Walmart and Comercial Mexicana.

According to Hoover's, it is "Mexico's third-largest retailer (after Walmart and Soriana), the supermarket giant sells groceries, apparel, and non-perishable items in 262 stores.

The California operations began in 1997, later expanded to Nevada, Arizona, New Mexico and Texas. The stores there are branded El Super, and operated by Grupo Chedraui's Bodega Latina Corporation, headquartered in Paramount, CA. In 2018, Bodega Latina acquired Fiesta Mart in Texas. In July 2021, Bodega Latina acquired the 250-store Smart and Final banner stores from Apollo Global Management.  Following the Smart & Final acquisition, in 2022 Bodega Latina changed its corporate name to Chedraui USA.<ref>

Gallery

See also 
Soriana
Comercial Mexicana

References

External links

 Chedraui website 
 Chedraui USA website 
 El Super website

Companies listed on the Mexican Stock Exchange
Retail companies established in 1927
Retail companies of Mexico
Supermarkets of Mexico